Sogebank, formally known as Société Générale Haïtienne de Banque, S.A. (Haitian Banking Corporation), is one of Haiti's three largest commercial banks. It was formed on April 26, 1986, when the Royal Bank of Canada sold its Haiti-based operations to a group of Haitian investors. It acquired Banque intercontinentale de Commerce (BIDC) in November 1998 and the failing Banque de Promotion commerciale et industrielle (Promobank) in September 2006. Sogebank currently has 42 branches located throughout the country in the major cities as well as several solely in Port-au-Prince. The main Sogebank building is located in the capital on the main road of Delmas. Nowadays, the Sogebank Group includes seven subsidiaries each concerning a separate branch of banking transactions and a foundation:

 Sogebank (Commercial bank)
 Sogebel (Building society)
 Sogesol (Microcredit)
 Sogecarte (Credit card issuer)
 SogeXpress (Money transfer)
 Sogefac (Consumer finance)
 SogeAssurance (Insurance)
 Fondation Sogebank (Philanthropy)

References
  

1986 establishments in Haiti
Banks of Haiti
Companies based in Port-au-Prince